Talking Heads '77 is the second studio album by Peach of Immortality, released in 1985 by Adult Contemporary Recordings.

Reception

AllMusic gave Talking Heads '77 a rating of two out of five stars and said "the confusingly-titled Talking Heads '77 is actually the first record from the sonic collage artists Peach of Immortality."

Track listing

Personnel
Adapted from the Talking Heads '77 liner notes.

Peach of Immortality
 David Gamble – instruments
 Jared Louche (as Jared Hendrickson) – guitar
 Rogelio Maxwell – cello
 Tom Smith – tape, producer

Production and design
 Tom Coyne – mastering
 Don Fleming – engineering, mixing, photography, recording (6)
 Joe Kennedy – mixing
 Marlene Weisman Studio – design

Release history

References

External links 
 

1985 albums
Peach of Immortality (band) albums
Fifth Colvmn Records albums